The Idiots is a 1998 Danish dark comedy-drama film written and directed by Lars von Trier. It is his first film made in compliance with the Dogme 95 Manifesto, and is also known as Dogme #2. It is the second film in von Trier's Golden Heart Trilogy, preceded by Breaking the Waves (1996) and succeeded by Dancer in the Dark (2000). It is among the first films to be shot entirely with digital cameras.

It was screened at the 1998 Cannes Film Festival and was nominated for the Palme d’Or, despite being met with widespread criticism upon release.

Plot
A seemingly anti-bourgeois group of adults spend their time seeking their "inner idiot" to release their inhibitions. They do so by behaving in public as if they were developmentally disabled.

At a restaurant, the patrons are disturbed by the group's mischief, barely contained by their supposed "handler", Susanne; however, single diner Karen develops an appreciation of their antics. The members of the group refer to this behaviour as "spassing", a neologism derived from "spasser", the Danish equivalent of "spaz". Karen leaves in a taxi with the people from the restaurant, and she finds herself at a big house. The apparent leader of the group, Stoffer, is supposed to be selling the house (which belongs to his uncle), but instead it becomes the focal point for group activities.

The "spassing" is a self-defeating attempt by the group to challenge the establishment through provocation. The self-styled idiots feel that the society-at-large treats their intelligence uncreatively and unchallengingly; thus, they seek the uninhibited self-expression that they imagine a romantic ideal of disability will allow.

Stoffer, at his birthday party, wishes for a "gangbang", and both clothes and inhibitions are soon discarded. Then, when Stoffer calls for the group members to let idiocy invade their personal daily lives, Karen takes up the challenge. She takes Susanne back to her house, where they are greeted with surprise by Karen's mother. Karen has been missing for two weeks, following the death of her young baby; she offers no explanation of where she has been. Karen attempts to spaz in front of her family by dribbling her food, but this results in a violent slap from her husband, Anders. Karen and Susanne leave the house together.

Cast

 Bodil Jørgensen as Karen
 Jens Albinus as Stoffer
 Anne Louise Hassing as Susanne
 Troels Lyby as Henrik
 Nikolaj Lie Kaas as Jeppe
 Louise Mieritz as Josephine
 Henrik Prip as Ped
 Luis Mesonero as Miguel
 Knud Romer Jørgensen as Axel
 Trine Michelsen as Nana
 Anne-Grethe Bjarup Riis as Katrine
 Paprika Steen as High-class lady
 Erik Wedersøe as Stoffer's uncle
 Michael Moritzen as Man From Municipality
 Anders Hove as Josephine's father
 Lars von Trier (uncredited voice) as Interviewer

Production
The Idiots is a co-production of companies from Denmark, France, Italy, the Netherlands, Spain, and Sweden. It was filmed during May and June 1997. The script was written over just four days, between 16-19 May.

Style
The confession of a Dogme 95 film is an idea adapted by Thomas Vinterberg in the first Dogme 95 film: Make a confession if there were things happening on the shoot which are not in accordance with the strict interpretation of the Dogme 95 rules. It is written from the director's point of view. Accordingly, von Trier made the following confession:

In relation to the production of Dogme 2 "The Idiots", I confess:
 To have used a stand-in in one case only (the sexual intercourse scene).
 To have organised payment of cash to the actors for shopping of accessories (food).
 To have intervened with the location (by moving sources of light – candlelight – to achieve exposure).
 To have been aware of the fact that the production had entered into an agreement of leasing a car (without the knowledge of the involved actor).

All in all, and apart from the above, I feel to have lived up to the intentions and rules of the manifesto: Dogme95.

In order to not violate Dogme 95 rule 2, forbidding the use of non-diegetic music, a harmonica player was recorded during the shooting of some scenes, including the end credits, even if he is not seen onscreen.

Release
The Idiots provoked a storm of publicity and debates, one of which was about the fictional representation of disability. Film critic Mark Kermode's reaction was to shout "Il est merde! Il est merde! (sic)" from the back of the auditorium during the official screening of the film at Cannes, a spontaneous review for which he was ejected from the venue.

Channel 4 aired the film unedited in 2005 as part of the channel's "Banned" season exploring censorship and cinematic works. Viewer complaints prompted an Ofcom investigation, which came out in favour of Channel 4. In its ruling, Ofcom found the film "not in breach" of the relevant Code under the specific circumstances of the broadcast, that is "the serious contextualisation of the film within a season examining the censorship of film and television, its artistic purpose, the channel which transmitted it, the strong warnings before the film and prior to the scene in question and the scheduling after midnight". Ofcom added the caveat that "while we do not consider the film was in breach of the Code on this occasion, we must consider carefully the acceptability of any similar content on an individual basis".

The film is classified as adult-only in Argentina, Australia (though it has been shown uncut on TV with an MA rating), Chile, New Zealand, Norway, South Korea, Spain, Taiwan, and the United Kingdom. In Switzerland and Germany, the film ran uncut with a 16-years rating in theaters, followed by a DVD release with the same rating and several uncut television airings.

Reception

Critical reception
On the review aggregator website Rotten Tomatoes, the film has a 71% score based on 31 reviews, with an average rating of 6.5/10. The website's consensus reads, "The Idiots feels more like an experiment than a coherent narrative, but director Lars von Trier's provocative style and rumination on civilization will leave most audience members feeling like satisfied test subjects". Metacritic reports a 47 out of 100 rating based on 15 critics, indicating "mixed or average reviews". Reactions to the film ranged from strong criticism to strong praise. A.O. Scott wrote a critical review in The New York Times, calling the film "a two-hour, semi-pornographic Mentos commercial" and singled out the final scene in particular for strong criticism, stating that the film "descends to truly contemptible emotional brutality". Conversely, Owen Glieberman in Entertainment Weekly described the film as "a raw, funny, maddening ramble" where von Trier "seeks catharsis by pushing everything to extremes" and described the final scene as "a gripping moment of high torment".

The Idiots was ranked #76 in Empire magazine's "The 100 Best Films of World Cinema" in 2010. The magazine had previously given it a full five star rating on its release in UK cinemas. It is listed as #941 in the film reference book '1001 Movies You Must See Before You Die'.

Controversy
More controversy arose over the sexual content, which was unusually explicit for a narrative film. The Idiots contains a shower scene in which a member of the group (in character as an "idiot") has an erection and, later, a group sex scene that includes one couple (faces not seen, stand-ins from the porn industry) having unsimulated penetrative (vaginal) sexual intercourse. Both instances of explicit content are in view only for a few seconds. The film was cleared for theatrical release by the British Board of Film Classification, receiving an 18 certificate. When it was shown on Film4 (then FilmFour) in 2000, the erection and the intercourse were obscured by pixelization, following an order from the Independent Television Commission.

Accolades
The film was shown in competition at the 1998 Cannes Film Festival.
 Bodil Awards (1999)
 Won: Best Actress, Bodil Jørgensen
 Won: Best Supporting Actor, Nikolaj Lie Kaas
 Won: Best Supporting Actress, Anne Louise Hassing
 Nominated: Best Film
 Cannes Film Festival (1998)
 Nominated: Palme d'Or
 European Film Awards (1998)
 Nominated: European Film Award, Best Screenwriter
 London Film Festival (1998)
 Won: FIPRESCI Prize, Lars von Trier
 Robert Festival (1999)
 Won: Best Actress, Bodil Jørgensen
 Valladolid International Film Festival (1998)
 Nominated: Golden Spike, Lars von Trier

References

External links
 
 
 
 

1998 films
1990s Danish-language films
1998 comedy-drama films
Danish avant-garde and experimental films
Danish comedy-drama films
Danish independent films
French avant-garde and experimental films
French comedy-drama films
French independent films
Dutch avant-garde and experimental films
Dutch comedy-drama films
Dutch independent films
Italian comedy-drama films
Italian independent films
Spanish avant-garde and experimental films
Spanish comedy-drama films
Spanish independent films
Swedish avant-garde and experimental films
Swedish comedy-drama films
Swedish independent films
Camcorder films
Danish Culture Canon
Dogme 95 films
Scanbox Entertainment films
Films directed by Lars von Trier
Films set in Denmark
Films shot in Denmark
Films about disability
1990s avant-garde and experimental films
1998 independent films
1990s French films
1990s Swedish films
Danish black comedy films
Swedish black comedy films
1990s black comedy films